The 39th century BC was a century which lasted from the year 3900 BC to 3801 BC.

Events

 The Post Track, an ancient causeway in the Somerset Levels, England, is built, c. 3838 BC. It is one of the oldest engineered roads discovered in Northern Europe.
 The Sweet Track, an ancient causeway also in the Somerset Levels, the oldest timber trackway discovered in Northern Europe, is built in 3807 BC or 3806 BC; tree-ring dating (dendrochronology) enabled very precise dating.
Plough in use.

References

 

-1
-61